Drymophila is a genus of flowering plants in the family  Alstroemeriaceae. It has also been placed in Luzuriagaceae, Convallariaceae and Liliaceae.

There are two species, both native to Australia:

References

Alstroemeriaceae
Liliales genera
Monocots of Australia